Nayaka dynasties emerged during the Kakatiya dynasty and the Vijayanagara Empire period. The Nayakas were originally military governors under the Vijayanagara Empire. After the battle of Talikota, several of them declared themselves independent.

Major Nayaka kingdoms

The Nayaka kingdoms included the following:
Musunuri Nayakas, 14th century Kamma warrior-kings from Telangana and Andhra Pradesh.
Pemmasani Nayaks, 15th–17th century Kamma ruling clan from Andhra Pradesh.
 Madurai Nayak, 16th–18th century Telugu rulers.
 Thanjavur Nayak, 16th–17th century Telugu rules of Thanjavur, Tamil Nadu.
 Nayaks of Gingee (Senji), 16th–17th century Telugu rulers from Tamil Nadu, previously governors of the Vijayanagara Empire.
 Nayakas of Chitradurga, 16th–18th century from Karnataka, previously feudatory chiefs of Hoysala and Vijayanagara Empire.
 Nayakas of Keladi, 16th–18th century ruling dynasty from Keladi, Karnataka.
 Nayaks of Vellore, 16th century Telugu chieftains under the Vijayanagara Empire from Channapatna and Rayadurgam.
 Nayakas of Kalahasti, 17th–18th century rulers of Kalahasti and Vandavasi.
 Nayaks of Kandy, Telugu rulers of the Kingdom of Kandy between 1739 and 1815. 
 Nayakas of Shorapur, rulers of Shorapur, Karnataka (final ruler was the 19th century Raja Venkatappa).
 Ravella Nayaks, 15th-17th century chieftains from Andhra Pradesh

Other Nayaka kingdoms

 Nayakas of Harappanahalli
 Nayakas of Gummanayakana Palya
 Nayakas of Gattu
 Nayakas of tadigolu
 Nayakas of Kuppam
 Nayakas of Rayalaseema
 Nayakas of Jarimale
 Nayakas of Gudekote
 Nayakas of Nayakanahatti
 Nayakas of Challapalli
 Nayakas of Amaravathi

Notes

References

Telugu people
Telugu monarchs
Dynasties of India
History of Tamil Nadu